Garal is a small village located 23 km south of Barmer, Rajasthan, India.

Villages in Barmer district